The Onitini are a tribe of old-world dung beetle genera, erected by Frederic William Hope.

Genera 
BioLib lists:
 Acanthonitis Janssens, 1937
 Allonitis Janssens, 1936
 Anonychonitis Janssens, 1950
 Aptychonitis Janssens, 1937
 Bubas Mulsant, 1842
 Cheironitis van Lansberge, 1875
 Gilletellus Janssens, 1937
 Heteronitis Gillet, 1911
 Janssensellus Cambefort, 1976
 Kolbeellus Jacobson, 1906
 Lophodonitis Janssens, 1938
 Megalonitis Janssens, 1937
 Neonitis Péringuey, 1901
 Onitis Fabricius, 1798
 Platyonitis Janssens, 1942
 Pleuronitis Van Lansberge, 1875
 Pseudochironitis Ferreira, 1977
 Tropidonitis Janssens, 1937

Gallery

References

External links
 
 

 Beetle tribes